The first Celebrity series of Ex on the Beach and eleventh overall series began airing on 21 January 2020 with a 90-minute special, and concluded on 28 April following fifteen episodes making this the longest series to date. This series is billed as "Celebrity Ex on the Beach" based on the Brazilian version, it features a set of famous cast members. The series was filmed in Marbella.

The series follows the cancellation of the tenth regular series, which was set to air in early 2019, which was cancelled due to the death of cast member Mike Thalassitis. None of the other cast members for the tenth series were announced.

Cast
The list of celebrity cast members was released on 9 December 2019. They include four men; Olympic athlete Ashley McKenzie, television personality Calum Best, The Only Way Is Essex star Joey Essex, and Love Island star Michael Griffiths, and four women; Love Island star Georgia Harrison, The Valleys star Lateysha Grace, playboy model Lorena Medina and Mob Wives star Marissa Jade. It was also announced that the exes joining the series would be celebrities.

All original cast members arrived at the beach during the first episode, which already featured a pair of exes in Calum and Marissa. Ellie Brown, star of the fourth series of Love Island was the first ex to arrive, hoping to rekindle a relationship with her old flame Joey. TV personality David McIntosh debuted during the second episode, joining as a new cast member rather than an ex. The third episode included the arrival of Celebs Go Dating star Victoria Winterford, the ex-girlfriend of Calum, whilst Itay Ohayon arrived as Lorena’s ex-boyfriend in the fourth episode. Episode five featured double trouble as Love Island cast member Charlie Brake showed up to give Ellie some closure, and Danni Kedward came looking for answers from her former flame Ashley M. Geordie Shore star Sophie Kasaei joined the cast during the sixth episode, which also included the arrival of American TV personality Tiffany Pollard as the ex-girlfriend of David. Itay was also sent home during this episode following a twist giving Sophie the ultimate power. Former Big Brother housemate Lotan Carter arrived during episode eight as the ex of Victoria. This episode also included the departures of Charlie and Danni after they were sent packing by the original cast. Another of Lorena's exes, Patrick Hale joined during the ninth episode desperate to win her back, whilst the tenth included Tiffany, Lotan and Victoria all packing their bags and heading home. Calum was forced to pick between two of his exes, Ayesha Reid and Megan Rapley during the eleventh episode. He ultimately chose to send home Ayehsa. Episode twelve featured the arrival of Made in Chelsea cast member Miles Nazaire, as well as David’s ex-girlfriend and former WAGS Miami star Metisha Schaefer who was hell-bent on getting revenge. Patrick was sent packing following a twist in the thirteenth episode, with Lateysha also deciding to return home. Georgia’s former flame Ashley Tyler arrived during this episode as the final ex.

Bold indicates original cast member; all other cast were brought into the series as an ex.

Duration of cast

Table Key
 Key:  = "Cast member" is featured in this episode
 Key:  = "Cast member" arrives on the beach
 Key:  = "Cast member" has an ex arrive on the beach
 Key:  = "Cast member" has two exes arrive on the beach
 Key:  = "Cast member" arrives on the beach and has an ex arrive during the same episode
 Key:  = "Cast member" leaves the beach
 Key:  = "Cast member" has an ex arrive on the beach and leaves during the same episode
 Key:  = "Cast member" arrives on the beach and leaves during the same episode
 Key:  = "Cast member" features in this episode as a guest
 Key:  = "Cast member" does not feature in this episode

Episodes

Ratings

References

External links
 

2020 British television seasons
11